Epitola uranoides, the Libert's giant epitola, is a butterfly in the family Lycaenidae. It is found in Guinea, Sierra Leone, Liberia, Ivory Coast, Ghana, Togo, Cameroon, the Republic of the Congo, the Central African Republic, the Democratic Republic of the Congo and Uganda. Its habitat consists of forests.

Subspecies
Epitola uranoides uranoides (Cameroon, Congo, Central African Republic, Democratic Republic of the Congo, Uganda)
Epitola uranoides occidentalis Libert, 1999 (Guinea, Sierra Leone, Liberia, Ivory Coast, Ghana, Togo)

References

Poritiinae
Butterflies of Africa
Insects of Central Africa
Insects of East Africa
Lepidoptera of West Africa
Butterflies described in 1999